In French folklore, the Graoully (spelled as Graouli, Graouilly, Graouille or Graully) is a creature with the appearance of a dragon. According to legend, it lived in the arena of the Roman amphitheater in Metz, France. Legends state that Saint Clement of Metz fought against Graoully and vanquished the beast.

Etymology 
It is believed that the word Graoully derives from the French word "grouiller" meaning "swarm". This has been attributed to the myth that the dragon and the large serpents were like a swarm in the amphitheater. Other origins suggested for the name include the German word "gräulich", which can mean "grayish" or "horrible". The closest English synonym it has is "gruesome" or "macabre". It has been proposed that the word "graula" may have been the origin of the name. It was commonly used in fourteenth century French as a synonym for raven, especially when used to describe ravens as a bad omen.

Cultural representation 
The legend of St. Clement inspired several other legends of dragonslayer Saints. While Graoully became a symbol of Metz and remains one of the major symbols used by a number of major establishments in the city. Graoully was also used in the local Oscan Games from the twelfth century till the start of the French Revolution.

Procession of Graoully 
A procession with an effigy of the dragon was held in the city till the nineteenth century. It started in the eleventh century when three banners were carried in the procession of Saint Mark during Rogation days. One of these depicted a dragon's head. During the following century, an effigy of the dragon was constructed and paraded along with the banner. Later on a huge Graoully effigy was used instead of the banners. The French Renaissance writer François Rabelais described the Graoully's effigy during a procession of the sixteenth century:  The construction of the effigy continued to evolve and in the 18th century, it was constructed as a canvas figure filled with hay and twelve feet high. The jaws did not move, and the forked tongue ended with points of iron. Every baker in front of whom the procession passed, picked up a half-pound white bun and gave it to the bearer of the dragon.

Symbolic representation 
A number of writers have stated that the legend of the Graoully is a symbol of Christianity's victory over paganism, with Saint Clement representing religion and paganism represented by the harmful dragon. The oldest known sculpture to date is located at 10 rue Chêvremont, on the maison du serpent. There is also a representation of Graoully on a house in the rue de la Marne in Sarrebourg and in a room in the Château du Haut-Kœnigsbourg. A depiction of Graoully from the 16th century is in the crypt in the cathedral of the Saint-Etienne. Another sculpture is suspended in mid-air on Taison street, near the cathedral. The name of the Rue Taison is traced back to a warning from the Graoully: "Taisons, taisons nous, voilà le Graoully qui passe" ( Be silent leave the Graoully alone ). Supposedly Saint Clement had uttered spoken the words "taisons-nous" on his entry into the city. The Groully is also featured on the coats of arms of FC Metz.

References 

French folklore
European dragons
French legendary creatures